Shaykh Malik, popularly known as Pir Yemeni was a pir who lived in Bengal.

History
Yemeni decided to leave his home country of Yemen to propagate Islam in the Indian subcontinent.

It has been claimed that he met Shah Jalal at the khanqah of Nizamuddin Auliya in Delhi and then took part alongside him in the 1303 Conquest of Sylhet. Following the successful conquest, Yemeni and Shah Balkhi were sent to preach Islam in Dhaka by Shah Jalal. The two men established a khanqah in Dhaka. It was situated in close proximity to the present Secretariat Buildings of the Government of Bangladesh.

However, it has been noted in Yemeni's mazar (mausoleum) that he died in 915 Hijri which corresponds to 1509–1510, roughly two hundred years after the conquest in the Sylhet region. In the 19th century, the erstwhile Nawab of Dhaka Khwaja Ahsanullah renovated his tomb. A mosque was built near his tomb. The establishments are situated on the northeastern side of Osmani Udyan on Abdul Ghani road. The nearby "Pir Yameni Market" (also known as Pir Yemini Market) has been named after him.

References

Bengali Sufi saints
Yemeni Sufi saints
People from Dhaka
1509 deaths